Vertigo Comics was an American comic book imprint started in 1993. It was DC Comics' most famous imprint, aimed at "mature readers", and has published many critically acclaimed titles, both company-owned, such as The Sandman and Hellblazer, and creator-owned, such as Preacher and Y: The Last Man. It was discontinued in January 2020, with ongoing series moved to the DC Black Label imprint, and future reprints also published under the new imprint.

Publications

0–9

A

B

C

D

E

F

G

H

I

J

K

L

M

N

O

P

R

S

T

U

V

W

Y

Z

Graphic novels

See also 
 List of Vertigo reprint collections
 List of DC Comics publications

References

External links 
 
 

 
Vertigo